Yamada (山田) is the 12th most common Japanese surname. Notable people with the surname include:

, Japanese model, actress and idol
, Japanese field hockey player
, Japanese illustrator and manga artist
, Japanese rugby union player
, Japanese philosopher
, Japanese politician and samurai
, Japanese writer
, Japanese samurai
, Japanese samurai
, Japanese beauty pageant winner
, Japanese writer
, Japanese women's footballer
, Japanese basketball player
, Japanese general
, Japanese softball player
, Japanese Mahayana Buddhist
Fernando Yamada (born 1979), Brazilian footballer
, Japanese voice actress
, pen name of Seiya Yamada, Japanese writer
, Japanese footballer
, Japanese cross-country skier
, Japanese footballer and manager
, Japanese cross-country skier
, Japanese badminton player
, Japanese admiral 
Hiroki Yamada (disambiguation), multiple people
, Japanese chef
, Japanese long jumper
, Japanese politician
, Japanese footballer
, Japanese computer scientist
, Japanese baseball player
, Japanese video game composer
, better known as Knock Yokoyama, Japanese comedian and politician
, Japanese film director
, Japanese actress
, Japanese footballer
, Japanese swordsman
, Japanese manga artist
, Japanese actor
, Japanese footballer
, Japanese women's basketball player
, Japanese long-distance runner
, Japanese conductor
, Japanese classical composer and conductor
, Japanese badminton player
, Japanese voice actor
, better known as Jushin Liger, Japanese professional wrestler
, Japanese politician
, Japanese singer
, Japanese manga artist
, better known as Black Buffalo, Japanese professional wrestler
, Japanese long-distance runner
, Japanese golfer
Kenji Yamada (disambiguation), multiple people
Kenneth Yamada, American biologist
, Japanese Go player
, better known as Kiyoshi Hikawa, Japanese enka singer
, Japanese photographer
, Japanese footballer
, Japanese billiards player
, Japanese doctor
, Japanese classical composer and conductor
, Japanese footballer
, Japanese Zen Buddhist
, Japanese shogi player
Kyle Yamada (born 1983), Canadian soccer player
, Japanese figure skater and coach
, better known as Riona Hazuki, Japanese actress
, Japanese architect
, Japanese mixed martial artist
Mariko Yamada (born 1950), Japanese American politician
, Japanese actress and gravure idol
, Japanese physicist
, Japanese weightlifter
, Japanese politician
Masahiro Yamada (disambiguation), multiple people
Masaki Yamada (disambiguation), multiple people
, Japanese footballer
, Japanese footballer
, Japanese footballer and manager
, Japanese shogi player
, Japanese voice actress
, Japanese rhythmic gymnast
, Japanese politician
, Japanese footballer
, Japanese footballer
Mitsuye Yamada (born 1923), American poet, activist, and professor
, Japanese softball player
, Japanese taekwondo practitioner
, Japanese calligrapher
, Japanese manga artist, writer and poet
, Japanese adventurer, governor of a province of the Ayutthaya Kingdom (Thailand)
, Japanese idol and singer
, Japanese manga artist
, Japanese footballer
, Japanese animator and film director
, Japanese footballer
, Japanese volleyball player
, Japanese footballer
, Japanese speed skater
, Japanese politician
, Japanese general
, Japanese manga artist
, Japanese Zen Buddhist
, Japanese footballer
, Japanese singer and actor
Ryoun Yamada, Japanese Zen Buddhist
Sachiko Yamada (disambiguation), multiple people
, Imperial Japanese Navy admiral
, Japanese ski mountaineer
, Japanese badminton player
, Japanese motorcycle racer
, Japanese politician
, Japanese musician
, Japanese model, actor and singer
, Japanese businessman
, Japanese cross-country skier
, Japanese footballer
, Japanese footballer
, Japanese volleyball player
, Japanese politician
, Japanese metallurgic artist
Sobin Yamada, Japanese Zen Buddhist
Tachi Yamada (1945–2021), scientist and gastroenterologist
, Japanese writer and screenwriter
, Japanese rower
, Japanese footballer
Takahiro Yamada (disambiguation), multiple people
, Japanese actor, singer and producer
Takeshi Yamada (born 1960), American artist
, Japanese Go player
, Japanese footballer
, Japanese footballer
, Japanese singer-songwriter
Tarzan Yamada (born 1962), Japanese drifting driver
, Japanese actor
, Japanese karateka
, Japanese baseball player
, Japanese ice hockey player
, Japanese politician
, Japanese professional wrestler
, Japanese writer, illustrator and translator
, Japanese feminist
, Japanese boxer
, Japanese film director
, Japanese actor and voice actor
, Japanese linguist
, Japanese footballer
, Japanese anime screenwriter
, Japanese mixed martial artist
, Japanese footballer
, Japanese aikidoka
, Japanese model, actress and singer
, Japanese actor
, Japanese darts player
, Japanese ski jumper
, Japanese composer
, Japanese footballer
, Japanese footballer

Fictional characters
, protagonist of the manga series B Gata H Kei
The Yamadas, characters in the film My Neighbors the Yamadas
, a character in the manga series Working!!
, a character in the manga series Honey and Clover
Chi Yamada, protagonist of the manga series Chi's Sweet Home
, a character in the light novel series Eromanga Sensei
, a character in the manga series Bleach
, a character in the visual novel Danganronpa: Trigger Happy Havoc
, a character in the manga series My Hero Academia
, a character from the multimedia project Hypnosis Mic: Division Rap Battle
, a character from the multimedia project Hypnosis Mic: Division Rap Battle
, a character from the multimedia project Hypnosis Mic: Division Rap Battle
, a character in the video game Fatal Fury 2
, a character in the manga series Shaman King
, a character in the light novel series Infinite Stratos
, protagonist of the manga series Kocchi Muite! Miiko
, protagonist of the manga series Mamotte! Lollipop
, a character in the anime series Valvrave the Liberator
, protagonist of the manga series Yamada-kun and the Seven Witches
, a character in the manga series Sensitive Pornograph
, a character in the anime series Tenchi Muyo! GXP
, protagonist of the manga series Kanpai!
, a character in the anime series Zombie Land Saga
, a character in the manga series Dokaben
Taro Yamada, protagonist of the manga series Yamada Taro Monogatari
Taro Yamada character in Yandere Simulator
, a character in the television series Densha Otoko
, a character in the media franchise Pretty Rhythm
, a character in the manga series Kase-san
Hizashi Yamada (山田ひざし), better known as Present Mic in the anime and manga series My Hero Academia.

References

See also
Courtney Yamada-Anderson (born 1980), American skeleton racer
Japanese name

Japanese-language surnames